The Nova Artax is an Austrian single-place paraglider that was designed by Hannes Papesch and produced by Nova Performance Paragliders of Innsbruck. It is now out of production.

Design and development
The aircraft was designed as an intermediate glider. The models are each named for their relative size.

Variants
Artax S
Small-sized model for light pilots. The glider model is DHV 1-2 and AFNOR Standard certified.
Artax M
Mid-sized model for medium-weight pilots. The glider model is DHV 1-2 and AFNOR Standard certified.
Artax L
Large-sized model for heavier pilots. The glider model is DHV 1-2 and AFNOR Standard certified.

Specifications (Artax M)

References

Artax
Paragliders